Volakas is a former municipality in Elis, West Greece, Greece. After the administrative reform of 2011, it became a part of Pyrgos. The municipal unit has an area of 70.790 km2. Its seat of administration was in the town of Epitalio.

Volakas is situated on the Ionian Sea coast, southeast of Pyrgos and southwest of Olympia. The river Alfeios forms the northern border of the municipal unit. There are wooded hills in the northeastern part of Volakas, the southwestern part along the coast is flat and used for agriculture. The Greek National Road 9 (Patras - Pyrgos - Kyparissia) and the railway from Pyrgos to Kalamata run through Volakas. Operations at the small airport of Epitalio (ICAO: LGEP) have been suspended.

Subdivisions
The municipal unit Volakas was subdivided into the following communities (constituent villages in brackets):
Epitalio (Epitalio, Paralia)
Agridi 
Alfeiousa 
Anemochori

Historical population

See also
List of settlements in Elis

References

External links
Volakas municipal unit 

Populated places in Elis